Carl Wrangel may refer to:
 Carl Gustaf Wrangel (1613–1676), Swedish statesman and military commander
 Carl Henrik Wrangel (1681–1755), officer of the Swedish Army